James Buchan (19 April 1881 – 1950) was a Scottish professional footballer, best remembered for his seven years in the Football League with Manchester City as a wing half. He also played League football in England for Woolwich Arsenal and in Scotland for St Johnstone, Hibernian, Motherwell, Kilmarnock and Forfar Athletic. After his retirement from football, Buchan managed St Johnstone.

Career 
A wing half, Buchan began his career at hometown junior league club St Johnstone and moved to Scottish League First Division club Hibernian in 1902. In his first season at Easter Road he was a part of the team which won the 1902–03 First Division title. Buchan remained with the club until April 1904, when he moved to newly promoted English First Division club Woolwich Arsenal. He made just eight appearances during the early months of the 1904–05 season, before falling out of favour and moving north to join divisional rivals Manchester City in March 1905. Buchan remained at Hyde Road for the following seven years and after the heartbreak of relegation to the Second Division at the end of the 1908–09 season, he helped the club to an immediate return to the top-flight at the end of 1909–10. Buchan dropped out of favour during the 1910–11 season and returned to Scotland to finish his career with Motherwell, Kilmarnock, Forfar Athletic and a second spell with St Johnstone, whom he later managed between 1920 and 1922.

Personal life 
On 8 December 1915, during the second year of the First World War, Buchan attested as a reserve private in the Highland Light Infantry. He was mobilised on 28 August 1916 and transferred to the Army Pay Corps a matter of days later. Buchan was transferred to the Ayrshire (Earl of Carrick's Own) Yeomanry on 29 September 1917, with whom he served until being transferred to the army reserve in March 1919.

Honours 
Hibernian
 Scottish League First Division: 1902–03
Manchester City
 Football League Second Division: 1909–10

Career statistics

References

1881 births
Footballers from Perth, Scotland
Scottish Football League players
Scottish footballers
English Football League players
Hibernian F.C. players
Arsenal F.C. players
Manchester City F.C. players
Motherwell F.C. players
1950 deaths
St Johnstone F.C. players
Kilmarnock F.C. players
Forfar Athletic F.C. players
British Army personnel of World War I
Highland Light Infantry soldiers
Royal Army Pay Corps soldiers
Ayrshire (Earl of Carrick's Own) Yeomanry soldiers
Association football wing halves
Scottish football managers
St Johnstone F.C. managers
Scottish Football League managers